Carter Bradley Hogg (March 26, 1889 – April 2, 1935) was an American baseball player who played pitcher in the Major Leagues from 1911 to 1919.  Hogg played for the Boston Braves, Chicago Cubs, and Philadelphia Phillies. Hoff attended Mercer University.

As a hitter, Hogg was a better than average hitting pitcher in his major league career, posting a .247 batting average (40-for-162) with 10 RBI in 84 games, 13 of them as a pinch hitter. Defensively, he was strong, recording a .986 fielding percentage with only 2 errors in 142 total chances covering 448 innings pitched.

References

1889 births
1935 deaths
Major League Baseball pitchers
Boston Rustlers players
Boston Braves players
Chicago Cubs players
Philadelphia Phillies players
Mercer Bears baseball players
New Bedford Whalers (baseball) players
Mobile Sea Gulls players
Los Angeles Angels (minor league) players
Baseball players from Georgia (U.S. state)
People from Buena Vista, Georgia